Calvin Wray Lawrence House is a historic home located near Apex, Wake County, North Carolina.  The house was built about 1890, and is a two-story, three-bay, single-pile frame I-house with a central hall plan. It has a triple-A-roof; full-width, hip-roof front porch; and a two-story addition and two-story gabled rear ell.  Also on the property are the contributing well house, outhouse, and storage barn.

It was listed on the National Register of Historic Places in 2008.

References

Houses on the National Register of Historic Places in North Carolina
Houses completed in 1890
Houses in Wake County, North Carolina
National Register of Historic Places in Wake County, North Carolina